The 9th People's Choice Awards, honoring the best in popular culture for 1982, were held in 1983. They were broadcast on CBS.

Winners

Favorite Female Performer in a New TV Program:
Patti Duke Astin

Favorite Motion Picture Actress:
Jane Fonda,
Katharine Hepburn

Favorite All-Around Female Entertainer:
Barbara Mandrell

Favorite All-Around Male Entertainer:
Burt Reynolds

Favorite New TV Dramatic Program:
St. Elsewhere

Favorite TV Comedy Program:
M*A*S*H

Favorite TV Dramatic Program:
Hill Street Blues

Favorite Male Performer in a New TV Program:
David Hasselhoff

Favorite Female TV Performer:
Linda Evans,
Loretta Swit

Favorite Male Musical Performer:
Kenny Rogers

Favorite Motion Picture:
E.T. the Extra-Terrestrial

Favorite Young Motion Picture Performer:
Brooke Shields

Favorite TV Mini-Series:
The Blue and the Gray

Favorite Country Music Performer:
Kenny Rogers

Favorite Motion Picture Actor:
Burt Reynolds

Favorite New Song:
"Truly"
"Eye of the Tiger"

Favorite New TV Comedy Program:
Cheers

Favorite Male TV Performer:
Tom Selleck

Favorite Young TV Performer:
Gary Coleman

References

People's Choice Awards
1982 awards
1983 in American television
1982 awards in the United States
March 1983 events in the United States